A  or KF (English: "municipal enterprise") is a Norwegian company type. Specifically the term relates to an undertaking owned by a municipality. Each KF and FKF has its own separate board of directors and a managing director, but the undertakings are not limited liability companies. Municipalities and counties are also permitted to own limited companies.

Types of companies of Norway